Hanshou County is a county in Hunan Province, China, it is under the administration of Changde prefecture-city. The county seat is Longyang Subdistrict.

History
Abundant source of waters and rivers make Hanshou County a productive fish and rice area. Dongting Lake was once the largest lake in China. This changed in the 1950s when the national the Chinese government encouraged plantation of rice and built many dams in the lake. The area of Dongting Lake shrank dramatically. Owing to the river network in this district, a land transportation system was underdeveloped. The YuanJiang river splits the county into two parts, the so-called west lake region and the downtown region of Hanshou. Due to this fact, people from west lake region used to take a whole day to come all the way to the downtown because there was no bridge across the river, and cars and travelers have to count on the ferry to cross Yuan Jiang. In 2008, the YuanJiang Grand Bridge was constructed alleviating transportation across the river.

Administrative divisions
According to the result on adjustment of township-level administrative divisions of Hanshou County on November 20, 2015 Hanshou County has four subdistricts, 16 towns and three townships under its jurisdiction. they are:

16 Towns
 Bailuqiao
 Canggang
 Cuijiaqiao
 Fengjiapu
 Guantouzhen
 Jiangjiazui
 Junshanpu
 Longtanqiao
 Potou, Hanshou
 Taizimiao
 Xihu, Hanshou
 Yangtaohu
 Yanwanghu
 Yougang
 Zhoukou, Hanshou
 Zhujiapu

3 Townships
 Maojiatan
 Niejiaqiao
 Xizhou, Hanshou

4 Subdistricts
 Canglang, Hanshou
 Chenyang, Hanshou,
 Longyang, Hanshou
 Zhumushan

Climate

Economy
Hanshou has a population of 780,000. Many young people leave the county as migrant workers to south and east coastal areas, e.g. Guangdong, Shanghai, etc., in the hope of finding better jobs and education opportunities for themselves and their next generation. Young children are left at home and often attended by their grandparents.

Agriculture
Hanshou's economy relies mainly on agriculture. Rice, cotton, canola oil, green ramie, Italian aspens, various fishes from the Dongting lake, fleshes are the major products in the county. The settle-in of Zoomlion industrial park is deemed as a milestone for the industry development in this county. It brings as well a large number of jobs to this region. Raw agricultural products are processed by some local companies and exported abroad, for example, onions are cooked and canned to export to Japan by private JiaodeChang, Italian aspens are fabricated by private Guozhen Wooden Co. into shining fire-resistant wedge joint board for house construction in North America. Other state-owned factories such as paper-making company, spinning mill went into bankruptcy several years ago due to environmental pollutions, corruption and low efficiency to compete in the market.  Industry in this country is developing gradually with vast configuration change. The eastern part of the county is protected by the state law as a wet land conservation area. Thousands of acres of reeds sprawl across the wet land. Thanks to the enforcement of state law, the ecological system is minimally disturbed by anthropogenic activities in the conservation area and hosts hundreds types of fishes, birds and wild animals. A lot of tourists are attracted to the Western Dongting Lake National Wet Land Park to enjoy the peace and harmony of nature of Dongting Lake.

References

External links

 
County-level divisions of Hunan
Changde